Iwoye-Ketu is a town primarily located in Imeko Afon, Ogun State in southwest Nigeria with its western portion in Benin. The community shares a border with the Iwajowa local government area of Oyo State on the north. It is renowned for its production of cotton.

History
Oral tradition says that the town of Iwoye-Ketu can trace its origins to the ancient city of Ile Ife, the origin of Yoruba people and the cradle of Yoruba culture. The traditional rulers of the city were the sons of the Yoruba deity, Oduduwa as he  was the first ruler of Ile Ife. In mythology, Iwoye-Ketu was created by Olumu, a legendary king and pioneer traditional ruler of the town who migrated from Ile Ife. Olomu migrated to Iwoye Ketu with three major items: a crown, a staff called "Opa Ogbo" and his deity called "Orisa Oluwa".

Description and culture
The local farms are agrarian and the local university is the Federal University of Agriculture, Abeokuta, FUNAAB. However, Orisa Oluwa tradition forbids pig farming because pigs are dirty.

Local tradition also prohibits the use of umbrellas. Due to the honour and respect the community have for their deity, strong protocols were developed around avoiding the use of umbrellas. It is not illegal to own an umbrella or for people who live in the town to use one outside the locality. The punishment is not clear as it just does not happen. It is suspected, but not known, that visitors to the town would be forgiven for breaking this taboo.

The border is such that some residences have some rooms in one country and others in another. All the shops are willing to accept the currency of Nigeria or the currency of Benin, and stocks of imported products such as rice, wine, perfume and car tyres are readily available.

Geography
Iwoye-Ketu is located primarily in Ogun State southwestern Nigeria, with its western portion in Benin. It is inhabited by eight ethnic-groups, including Egun, Hausa, Igbo, Fulani, Igede, Ohoi and the Yorubas.

References

Ogun State
Populated places in Ogun State